Kappa Virginis (κ Virginis, abbreviated Kappa Vir, κ Vir), officially named Kang , is a solitary star in the zodiac constellation of Virgo. It has an apparent visual magnitude of 4.18, which is sufficiently bright to be seen with the naked eye. Based upon stellar parallax measurements, the distance to this star is about 255 light-years.

Nomenclature 

κ Virginis (Latinised to Kappa Virginis) is the star's Bayer designation.

In 2016, the IAU organized a Working Group on Star Names (WGSN) to catalog and standardize proper names for stars. The WGSN approved the name Kang for this star on 30 June and it is now so included in the List of IAU-approved Star Names.

Properties 

This is an orange-hued K-type giant star with a stellar classification of K2/3 III. It has about 146% of the mass of the Sun, but at an estimated age of 9.7 billion years it has evolved and expanded to over 25 times the Sun's radius. As a consequence, it shines with around 229 times the solar luminosity. The effective temperature of the star's outer atmosphere is 4,235 K.

References

Virginis, Kappa
Virgo (constellation)
K-type giants
Virginis, 098
069427
124294
Durchmusterung objects
5315